Wade Trappe is a professor of electrical and computer engineering at the Department of Electrical and Computer Engineering, Rutgers University, and an associate director of the Wireless Information Network Laboratory (WINLAB).

Trappe received his B.A. in mathematics from the University of Texas at Austin in 1994 and his Ph.D. in applied mathematics and computational science from the University of Maryland, College Park, in 2002. Trappe was an editor for IEEE Transactions on Information Forensics and Security, IEEE Signal Processing Magazine and IEEE Transactions on Mobile Computing and was the SPS' representative to the IEEE Signal Processing Society's governing board of IEEE TMC.

He was named Fellow of the Institute of Electrical and Electronics Engineers (IEEE) in 2014 "for contributions to information and communication security".

References

External links

20th-century births
Living people
American computer scientists
American electrical engineers
Fellow Members of the IEEE
University of Texas at Austin alumni
University of Maryland, College Park alumni
Rutgers University faculty
Year of birth missing (living people)
Place of birth missing (living people)